Scandinavian Center is a convention center in Aarhus, Denmark situated in the Midtbyen neighborhood at the city square of Margrethepladsen. Scandinavian Center was finished in 1995 by designs of the architect practice Friis & Moltke in a modern style. Today, the building is privately owned and used for various activities such a conventions, hotel and businesses. The building is a well-known landmark in central Aarhus, situated in Eckersbergsgade.

Architecture 
The convention center is situated on hilly terrain between the Aarhus Concert Hall and Sonnesgade at Godsbanen. The building is designed as a long glass covered promenade that covers the  height differential on the property. The central stairway runs obliquely through the building and includes walkways, elevators and greenery. The glass roof is supported by an arched pipe-construction. Materials for structure include yellow brick, black marble, granite, aluminum and jatoba for the floors.

The project was completed by entrepreneur Per Aarsleff A/S and the cooperative Jord & Beton Amba by designs of the architects  T. Skovgaard and Friis & Moltke. The landscape architect Schønherr designed the outdoors areas.

Background 
In the late 1980s, Aarhus city council decided to place a new convention and hotel center next to the Aarhus Concert Hall. The project was meant to revitalize the area around the concert hall, the river valley by Aarhus River and the old residential neighborhood Mølleengen but large parts of the project was never completed. Not until 15 to 20 years later, after the construction of the ARoS Aarhus Art Museum and the start of the redevelopment of Godsbanen into a culture center, did the area become more used. The current redevelopment of CeresByen north of the center is believed to finally turn this area of the central city into a more active location.

Gallery

See also 
 Architecture of Aarhus

References

External links 
 
 Scandinavian Center on Wikimedia Commons

Buildings and structures in Aarhus
Hotels in Aarhus
1995 establishments in Denmark